Feliciano Rosendo Marín Díaz (born 8 June 1960) is a Mexican politician from the Party of the Democratic Revolution. From 2009 to 2012 he served as Deputy of the LXI Legislature of the Mexican Congress representing the State of Mexico, and previously served in the LIII Legislature of the Congress of the State of Mexico.

References

1960 births
Living people
Politicians from the State of Mexico
Party of the Democratic Revolution politicians
20th-century Mexican politicians
21st-century Mexican politicians
Deputies of the LXI Legislature of Mexico
Members of the Chamber of Deputies (Mexico) for the State of Mexico
Members of the Congress of the State of Mexico